Charles A. Prosser Career Academy (formerly known as  Charles A. Prosser Vocational High School) is a public 4–year vocational high school located in the Belmont Cragin neighborhood on the northwest side of Chicago, Illinois, United States. Prosser opened in 1959 and is operated by the Chicago Public Schools district.

History
Prosser opened in September 1959 for males only, first enrolling females in the 1975-76 school year. Prior to the summer of 1998 the school's name was Prosser Vocational High School.  The school is named for Charles Allen Prosser, an educator who pioneered vocational education.

Curriculum
During their first year,  Prosser students enroll in the Freshman Academy, which eases the transition into high school. Students sign up in 8th grade if they want to be in the International Baccalaureate program. From there they can decide if they want to go to the IBDP or IBCP.

School activities

 Advanced Technology Group 
 Academic Decathlon
 After School Matters
 ASPIRA
 Cheerleading
 Drama
 Ecology Club
 The Falcon (newspaper)
 Anime Club
 GSA
 Key Club
 National Honor Society
 Rube Goldberg
 Student Council
 Tutoring
 Yearbook
 JROTC
 Culinary Arts
 Cosmetology Club

Athletics

 Baseball (M) (V, JV)
 Football (M) (V, JV)
 Soccer (F, M) (V, JV) 
 Softball (F) (V) 
 Track and field (M, F)
 Volleyball (M, F) (V, JV)
 Swimming (M, F) (V, JV) 
 Basketball (M, F) (V, JV)
 Cross Country (M, F) (V, JV)

Notable alumni

 John Wayne Gacy – serial killer with 33+ murders,rapes (technically not an alumnus, as he did not graduate)
 Wally "Freak" Kozielski – radio DJ; a part of Mancow's Morning Madhouse for many years; also worked for 94.7 The Zone, Q-101, Rock 103.5, The Blaze, and 105.5 The Kat; is currently on 10a-2p at WRXQ100.7 FM (Q-rock) in Chicago
 Eddie Winters - Police officer and politician; Former member of the Illinois House of Representatives
Delia Ramirez - Member of the Illinois House of Representatives, for the 4th district.

References

External links
School's official website

Public high schools in Chicago
Educational institutions established in 1959
1959 establishments in Illinois